Luv is a 1967 slapstick romantic comedy film starring Jack Lemmon, Peter Falk, Elaine May and Nina Wayne. It is based on the original Broadway production of the same name by Murray Schisgal, which opened at the Booth Theater in New York City on 11 November 1964. The play ran for 901 performances and was nominated for the 1965 Tony Award for Best Play.

Plot

About to nervously jump off a bridge, scrawny Harry Berlin (Jack Lemmon) is a barely functional human being. Just as he attempts to leap off the bridge, he is distracted by Milt Manville (Peter Falk), an old friend from fifteen years ago. Harry doesn't really recognize him at first but there appears to be a contrast between the two of them with Milt boasting of how well he is doing in life while Harry tries to listen.

Milt takes Harry to his house to meet Ellen Manville (Elaine May), Milt's long-suffering wife. She is complaining that their sex life is non-existent but Milt has a secret lover in the form of beautiful blonde Linda (Nina Wayne). Milt convinces a barely-there Harry to make a go of things with Ellen so that she is not left lonely when he divorces her for Linda. It takes a while but Harry and Ellen eventually fall in love. They marry and go to Niagara Falls for their honeymoon but this is when Ellen realizes that Harry is the world's worst roommate and childish at heart. In one example, Harry unexpectedly stomps on Ellen's toe in order to test her love for him.  As she hobbles in pain, she asks, "What did you do that for?" In response, he asks her if she still loves him, and she says she does.

As Milt and Linda start to settle down as a couple, she quickly realizes that he has an addiction to selling household items and junk for a quick buck, something that she is strongly against. She immediately dumps him, which causes Milt to want Ellen back when he realizes how much he truly loves her. She admits that she doesn't really love Harry as much as she thought, as his bizarre day-to-day activities get to her. Milt and Ellen plot to get back together and convince Harry to divorce her but he loves her and sets out to prove it by getting a job as an elevator operator in a shopping mall.

Milt and Ellen then get the idea of trying to make Harry fall in love with the pretty blonde Linda, but as a last resort they try to convince Harry to commit suicide once again on the bridge. It is only when the four of them end up on the bridge that Harry finds love with a bikini-clad Linda.

Cast
Jack Lemmon as Harry Berlin
Peter Falk as Milt Manville
Elaine May as Ellen Manville
Nina Wayne as Linda
Eddie Mayehoff as D.A. Goodhart
Paul Hartman as Doyle
Severn Darden as Vandergist
Alan DeWitt as Dalrymple
Terrayne Crawford as Woman on Playground (uncredited)
Harrison Ford as Irate Motorist (uncredited)
Cap Somers as Bartender (uncredited)

Reception

The film was generally not received well by critics when it was released in 1967.

Variety wrote: "Clive Donner's direction fits the frantic overtones of unfoldment, but in this buildup occasionally goes overboard for effect. Jack Lemmon appears to over-characterize his role, a difficult one for exact shading. Peter Falk as a bright-eyed schemer scores decisively in a restrained comedy enactment for what may be regarded as the picture's top performance."

Bosley Crowther's review in The New York Times was particularly critical, ending the review with: "It goes around in circles—but maybe going around in circles is your whim. If it is, "Luv" is the picture to make you dizzy doing so."

Home media
Luv was released to DVD by Sony Pictures Home Entertainment on 3 January 2012 as a Region 1 manufacture-on-demand DVD available through Amazon and from Mill Creek Entertainment on 22 April 2014 as a part of the Jack Lemmon Showcase Volume 1 with Luv on the fourth disc of a 4-disc set.

See also
List of American films of 1967

References

External links

1960s American films
1960s English-language films
1967 films
1967 romantic comedy films
Adultery in films
American black comedy films
American films based on plays
American romantic comedy films
Columbia Pictures films
Films about suicide
Films directed by Clive Donner
Films produced by Gordon Carroll
Films scored by Gerry Mulligan
Films set in New York (state)
Films shot in New York (state)